Mackinaw Township may refer to the following places in the United States:

 Mackinaw Township, Tazewell County, Illinois
 also: Little Mackinaw Township, Tazewell County, Illinois
 Mackinaw Township, Michigan

Township name disambiguation pages